Richard Tobin (3 January 1896 – 21 January 1957) was an Irish hurler who played as a right corner-forward for the Kilkenny senior team from 1916 until 1925.

Tobin made his first appearance for the team during the 1916 championship and became a regular player over the next decade. During that time he won one All-Ireland winner's medals and four Leinster winner's medals. He was later joined on the team by his brother Jimmy Tobin.

At club level Tobin played with the Emeralds club in Urlingford, however, he never won a county club championship|.

References

1896 births
1957 deaths
Emeralds hurlers
Kilkenny inter-county hurlers
All-Ireland Senior Hurling Championship winners